Year 1048 (MXLVIII) was a leap year starting on Friday (link will display the full calendar) of the Julian calendar.

Events 
By place

 Byzantine Empire 
 September 18 – Battle of Kapetron: A combined Byzantine-Georgian army, under Byzantine generals Aaronios and Katakalon Kekaumenos (supported by the Georgian duke Liparit IV), confronts the invading Seljuk Turks, led by Ibrahim Inal (a half-brother of Sultan Tughril), at Kapetron (near modern-day Pasinler). The Byzantines defeat their opposing Turkish forces in the flanks, but in the centre Ibrahim Inal captures Liparit, and is able to safely withdraw from Byzantine territory, laden with spoils and captives, including Liparit.
 Winter – Emperor Constantine IX sends an embassy with gifts and a ransom, for the release of Liparit IV to Tughril. However, the sultan sets Liparit free, on condition that he will never again fight the Seljuks.

 Europe 
 Winter – Emperor Henry III (the Black) appoints his cousin, Bishop Bruno of Toul (related to the counts of Egisheim-Dagsburg in Upper Alsace), as successor of Damasus II at an assembly at Worms.
 The city of Oslo is founded by King Harald III (Hardrada) of Norway (approximate date).

 England 
 1048 or 1066 - End of the Viking Age: Vikings make an unsuccessful raid on the Kingdom of England; The raiders flee to Flanders (modern Belgium).
 King Edward the Confessor goes to war against Flanders, blockading the English Channel with a fleet based at Sandwich in Kent.

By topic

Religion
 July 16 – At orders of Henry III, German troops under Boniface III (Canossa), enter Rome and expel Pope Benedict IX.
 July 17 – Pope Damasus II succeeds Benedict IX as the 151st pope of the Catholic Church, but he dies after 23 days.

Births 
 May 18 – Omar Khayyam, Persian mathematician and poet (d. 1131)
 May 25 – Shen Zong, emperor of the Song Dynasty (d. 1085)
 Alexios I (Komnenos), Byzantine emperor (d. 1118)
 Arwa al-Sulayhi, queen and co-ruler of Yemen (d. 1138)
 Domnall Ua Lochlainn, High King of Ireland (d. 1121)
 Harding of Bristol, English sheriff reeve (approximate date)
 Magnus II (Haraldsson), king of Norway (approximate date)
 Matilda of Germany, duchess of Swabia (d. 1060)
 Peter I, Italian nobleman (House of Savoy) (d. 1078)
 Sheikh Ahmad-e Jami, Persian Sufi writer and poet (d. 1141)
 Turgot of Durham, Scottish bishop (approximate date)

Deaths 
 January 25 – Poppo, abbot of Stavelot-Malmedy (b. 977)
 June 1 – Minamoto no Yorinobu, Japanese samurai (b. 968)
 June 7 – Berno of Reichenau, German abbot
 August 9 – Damasus II, pope of the Catholic Church
 November 11 – Adalbert, duke of Upper Lorraine (b. 1000)
 December 9 – Al-Biruni, Persian scholar and polymath (b. 973)
 Æthelstan of Abingdon, English abbot (or 1047)
 Cenn Fáelad Ua Cúill, Irish poet and Chief Ollam
 Humbert I, founder of the House of Savoy (or 1047)
 Jing Zong, Chinese empress of Western Xia (b. 1003)
Mael Fabhaill Ua hEidhin, king of Hy Fiachrach
 Rainulf II (Trincanocte), Italo-Norman nobleman

References